Nordhaug is a surname. Notable people with the surname include:

 Halvor Nordhaug (born 1953), Norwegian Lutheran bishop, son of Ole
 Lars Petter Nordhaug (born 1984), Norwegian road bicycle racer 
 Ole Nordhaug (1925-2021), Norwegian Lutheran bishop

Norwegian-language surnames